Charles Frederick Pardon (28 March 1850 - 18 April 1890) was editor of Wisden Cricketers' Almanack between 1887 and 1890. His father was the journalist George Frederick Pardon.

It was during his time as editor that the Wisden Cricketers of the Year awards began. After his death at age 40, his brother Sydney Pardon took over as editor for 35 years.  Charles, Sydney and another brother Edgar founded the Pardon's Cricket Reporting Agency in the 1870s.

References 

1850 births
1890 deaths
British sportswriters
Cricket historians and writers
Pardon, Charles